Saxifraga is the largest genus in the family Saxifragaceae, containing about 465 species of holarctic perennial plants, known as saxifrages or rockfoils. The Latin word saxifraga means literally "stone-breaker", from Latin  ("rock" or "stone") +  ("to break"). It is usually thought to indicate a medicinal use for treatment of urinary calculi (known as kidney or bladder stones), rather than breaking rocks apart.

Description

Most saxifrages are small perennial, biennial (e.g. S. adscendens) or annual (e.g. S. tridactylites) herbaceous plants whose basal or cauline leaves grow close to the ground, often in a rosette. The leaves typically have a more or less incised margin; they may be succulent, needle-like and/or hairy, reducing evaporation.

The inflorescence or single flower clusters rise above the main plant body on naked stalks. The small actinomorphic hermaphrodite flowers have five petals and sepals and are usually white, but red to yellow in some species. Stamens, usually 10, rarely 8, insert at the junction of the floral tube and ovary wall, with filaments subulate or clavate. As in other primitive eudicots, some of the 5 or 10 stamens may appear petal-like. and it lives in tundral ecosystems.

Taxonomy 

A genus of about 465 species. The former monotypic genus Saxifragella has been submersed within Saxifraga, the largest genus in Saxifragaceae, as Saxifraga bicuspidata. Also the genus Saxifragopsis (strawberry saxifrage) was previously included in Saxifraga.

Subdivision 

Based on morphological criteria, up to 15 sections were recognised. Subsequent molecular phylogenetic studies reduced this to 13 sections with 9 subsections. The former sections Micranthes and Merkianae are more closely related to the Boykinia and Heuchera clades. Modern floras separate these groups as the genus Micranthes.

The thirteen sections (with subsections) are:
Irregulares
Saxifragella
Pseudocymbalaria
Bronchiales
Ciliatae 
Cymbalaria
Cotylea
Gymnopera
Mesogyne
Trachyphyllum
Ligulatae
Porphyrion
Squarrosae
Mutatae
Oppositifoliae
Florulentae
Kabschia 
Saxifraga
Tridactylites
Androsaceae
Arachnoideae
Saxifraga

Selected species 

Saxifraga adscendens – ascending saxifrage
Saxifraga aizoides – Yellow mountain saxifrage, yellow saxifrage
Saxifraga aizoon – Aizoon rockfoil
Saxifraga algisii
Saxifraga anadyrensis
Saxifraga androsacea
Saxifraga aquatica
Saxifraga arachnoidea
Saxifraga × arendsii – mossy saxifrage, mossy rockfoil
Saxifraga aspera L. – rough saxifrage, stiff-haired saxifrage
Saxifraga bicuspidata
Saxifraga biflora
Saxifraga bronchialis L. – matte saxifrage
Saxifraga bryoides L. – mossy saxifrage
Saxifraga burseriana L. – AGM
Saxifraga caesia – blue green saxifrage
Saxifraga callosa Sm. – limestone saxifrage
Saxifraga canaliculata
Saxifraga carpatica
Saxifraga cernua – drooping saxifrage, nodding saxifrage, bulblet saxifrage
Saxifraga cervicornis
Saxifraga cespitosa – tufted saxifrage
Saxifraga ciliata
Saxifraga cochlearis – spoon-leaved saxifrage
Saxifraga columnaris Schmalh.
Saxifraga corsica
Saxifraga consanguinea W.W.Sm.
Saxifraga cotyledon L. – great alpine rockfoil, greater evergreen saxifrage
Saxifraga crustata Vest. – crusted-leaved saxifraga, silver saxifrage, encrusted saxifrage
Saxifraga cuneifolia – shield-leaved saxifrage, lesser London pride
Saxifraga cymbalaria – celandine saxifrage
Saxifraga decipiens
Saxifraga dinnikii Schmalh.
Saxifraga eschscholtzii – cushion saxifrage
Saxifraga exarata – furrowed saxifrage
Saxifraga flagellaris Willd. ex Sternb. – whiplash saxifrage, spider saxifrage, "spider plant"
Saxifraga florulenta
Saxifraga forbesei
Saxifraga fortunei Hook.f. – fortune saxifrage
Saxifraga × geum – Robertsoniana saxifrage (S. hirsuta x S. umbrosa)
Saxifraga globulifera – Gibraltar saxifrage
Saxifraga granulata L. – meadow saxifrage, bulbous saxifrage, fair maids of France (type species)
Saxifraga grisebachii - Engleria saxifrage
Saxifraga groenlandica
Saxifraga hederacea
Saxifraga hirculus L. – yellow marsh saxifrage, marsh saxifrage, "bog saxifrage"
Saxifraga hirsuta – kidney saxifrage
Saxifraga hyperborea – pygmy saxifrage
Saxifraga hypnoides – mossy saxifrage, Dovedale moss
Saxifraga juniperifolia
Saxifraga korshinskii Kom.
Saxifraga lactea Turcz.
Saxifraga longifolia – Pyrenean saxifrage
Saxifraga maderensis – Madeira saxifrage, Madeira breakstone
Saxifraga mertensiana – Mertens' saxifrage
Saxifraga montana
Saxifraga moschata – musky saxifrage, mossy saxifrage
Saxifraga moschata ssp. basaltica
Saxifraga muscoides
Saxifraga mutata
Saxifraga nathorstii (Dusén) Hayek – East Greenland saxifrage
Saxifraga nipponica
Saxifraga oppositifolia – purple saxifrage, purple mountain saxifrage
Saxifraga osloensis Knaben – Oslo saxifrage, a natural hybrid species
Saxifraga paniculata – lifelong saxifrage, white mountain saxifrage
Saxifraga paradoxa Sternb. – Fragile saxifraga
Saxifraga petraea
Saxifraga platysepala (= S. flagellaris auct. non Willd.) – broadsepal saxifrage
Saxifraga porophylla
Saxifraga redofskii – many-flower saxifrage
Saxifraga rivularis – alpine brook saxifrage, brook saxifrage, highland saxifrage
Saxifraga rosacea – Irish saxifrage
Saxifraga rotundifolia L. – round-leaved saxifrage
Saxifraga roylei
Saxifraga rudolphiana
Saxifraga rufopilosa – redhair saxifrage
Saxifraga sancta
Saxifraga serpyllifolia – thymeleaf saxifrage
Saxifraga sibirica – Siberian saxifrage
Saxifraga spathularis – Saint Patrick's cabbage
Saxifraga squarrosa – Dolomites saxifrage
Saxifraga stolonifera – creeping saxifrage, strawberry saxifrage, creeping rockfoil, strawberry begonia, strawberry geranium, Aaron's beard
Saxifraga stolonifera f. aptera (Makino) H.Hara – hoshizaki-yukinoshita (Japanese)
Saxifraga stolonifera 'Cuscutiformis' (Saxifraga cuscutiformis Lodd.) – Dodder-like saxifrage
Saxifraga subverticillata
Saxifraga svalbardensis
Saxifraga taygetea
Saxifraga taylorii – Taylor's saxifrage
Saxifraga tenella
Saxifraga tombeanensis
Saxifraga tricuspidata Rottb. – prickly saxifrage
Saxifraga tridactylites – rue-leaved saxifrage, "nailwort"
Saxifraga trifurcata
Saxifraga × urbium – London pride (S. spathularis × S. umbrosa)
Saxifraga umbrosa – Pyrenean saxifrage
Saxifraga vandelli
Saxifraga wahlenbergii

Formerly placed here
Plants formerly placed in Saxifraga are mainly but not exclusively Saxifragaceae. They include:
Astilboides tabularis, as S. tabularis
Bergenia crassifolia, as S. cordifolia, S. crassifolia
Bergenia pacumbis, as S. ligulata, S. pacumbis
Bergenia purpurascens, as S. delavayi, S. purpurascens
Boykinia jamesii, as S. jamesii
Boykinia occidentalis (Coastal Brookfoam), as S. elata
Boykinia richardsonii (Richardson's Brookfoam), as S. richardsonii
Darmera peltata (Indian Rhubarb), as S. peltata
Leptarrhena pyrolifolia, as S. pyrolifolia
Luetkea pectinata (Partridgefoot), as S. pectinata
Micranthes, including:Micranthes integrifolia (wholeleaf saxifrage)Micranthes howellii (Howell's saxifrage), as S. howelliiMicranthes stellaris (Starry saxifrage), as S. stellarisMukdenia rossii (Mukdenia), as S. rossiiOther "saxifragous" plants

Several plant genera have names referring to saxifrages, although they might not be close relatives of Saxifraga. They include:
Golden-saxifrages, ChrysospleniumBurnet-saxifrages, PimpinellaPepper-saxifrage, Silaum silaus. The name "silaum" comes from the Latin word sil, which means yellow ochre. This refers to the sulphorous yellow colour of the flowers.

Some plants refer to Saxifraga in their generic names or specific epithets, either because they are also "rock-breaking" or because they resemble members of the saxifrage genus:Campanula saxifragaCelmisia saxifraga (Benth.) W.M.CurtisCineraria saxifraga DC.Dryopteris saxifragaPetrorhagia saxifraga – TunicflowerPimpinella saxifraga – Burnet saxifragePtychotis saxifragaSaxifragellaSaxifragodesSaxifragopsis Small

Ecology

Saxifrages are typical inhabitants of Arctic–alpine ecosystems, and are hardly ever found outside the temperate parts of the Northern Hemisphere; most members of this genus are found in subarctic climates. The genus is also abundant in the Eastern and Western Himalayan alpine shrub and meadows. Though the archetypal saxifrage is a small plant huddling between rocks high up on a mountain, many species do not occur in such a habitat and are larger (though still rather delicate) plants found on wet meadows.

Various Saxifraga species are used as food plants by the caterpillars of some butterflies and moths, such as the Phoebus Apollo (Parnassius phoebus).

Charles Darwin – erroneously believing Saxifraga to be allied to the sundew family (Droseraceae) – suspected the sticky-leaved round-leaved saxifrage (S. rotundifolia), rue-leaved saxifrage (S. tridactylites) and Pyrenean saxifrage (S. umbrosa) to be protocarnivorous plants, and conducted some experiments whose results supported his observations, but the matter has apparently not been studied since his time.

Cultivation

Numerous species and cultivars of saxifrage are cultivated as ornamental garden plants, valued particularly as groundcover or as cushion plants in rock gardens and alpine gardens. Many require alkaline or neutral soil to thrive.

S. × urbium (London pride), a hybrid between Pyrenean saxifrage (S. umbrosa) and St. Patrick's cabbage (S. spathularis), is commonly grown as an ornamental plant. Another horticultural hybrid is Robertsoniana saxifrage (S. × geum), derived from kidney saxifrage (S. hirsuta) and Pyrenean saxifrage. Some wild species are also used in gardening. Cambridge University Botanic Garden hosts the United Kingdom's national collection of saxifrages.

Award of Garden Merit
The following species and cultivars have gained the Royal Horticultural Society's Award of Garden Merit:- 

'Angelina Johnson' (fortunei) 
'Blackberry and Apple Pie' (fortunei) S. callosa (limestone saxifrage)
'Conwy Snow' (fortunei) 
'Coolock Kate' 
'Cumulus' S. fortunei'Gregor Mendel' (× apiculata) 
'Lagraveana' (paniculata) 
'Lutea'
'Minor'
'Moe' (fortunei) 
'Monarch' 
'Mount Nachi' (fortunei) 
'Peach Melba'
'Reginald Farrer' (Silver Farreri Group) 
'Rokujo' (fortunei) 
'Rosea'
'Shiranami' (fortunei) 
'Slack's Ruby Southside' (Southside Seedling Group) 
'Snowflake' (Silver Farreri Group) 
'Southside Star' (Southside Seedling Group) S. stolonifera (strawberry saxifrage)
'Sue Drew' (fortunei) 
='Toujya' (fortunei) 
'Theoden'
'Tumbling Waters' 
S. × urbium (London pride)
'Venetia' (paniculata) 
'Whitehill' 

Uses

The leaves of some saxifrage species, such as creeping saxifrage (S. stolonifera) and S. pensylvanica, are edible. The former is a food in Korea and Japan. The flowers of purple saxifrage (S. oppositifolia) are eaten in Nunavut, Canada and the leaves and stems brewed as a tea.

Species are also used in traditional medicine, such as creeping saxifrage in East Asia and round-leaved saxifrage (S. rotundifolia) in Europe.

Two species—purple saxifrage and creeping saxifrage—are popular floral emblems. They are official flowers for:

Nunavut, Canada - purple saxifrage
County Londonderry, Northern Ireland - purple saxifrage
Tsukuba, Japan - creeping saxifrage, "hoshizaki" form (S. stolonifera Curtis f. aptera)

References

 Bibliography 

Books

Articles

Websites

Floras
, in Flora of China online vol. 8 see also PDF''

External links 

 
Saxifragaceae genera
Garden plants
Taxa named by Carl Linnaeus